Three ships of the Hellenic Navy have borne the name Pineios (Πηνειός), after the Pineios River in Thessaly:

Hellenic Navy ship names
Set index articles on ships